Terry's Chocolate Orange is a chocolate product created by Terry's in 1932 at Terry's Chocolate Works in York, England. The brand has changed ownership several times, and production was moved to Eastern Europe in 2005. Since 2018, the Terry's Chocolate Orange has been produced in Strasbourg, France, by Carambar.

Development

Chemist Joseph Terry joined a York sweets company in 1823, where he developed new lines of chocolate, candied peel, and marmalade. In 1830 he became sole owner of the business and following his death it was eventually passed to his sons, including Joseph Jr. who managed the company. In 1895 it became Joseph Terry and Sons Ltd., with directors including Joseph Jr. and his own son Thomas.
The company opened the Art Deco-style factory known as Terry's Chocolate Works in 1926, and began launching new products. These included the Dessert Chocolate Apple (1926), Terry's All Gold (1931) and the Chocolate Orange (1932).

At the onset of World War II, confectionery production was immediately halted. The factory was taken over by F. Hills and Sons of Manchester as a shadow factory to manufacture and repair aircraft propeller blades. With the factory handed back to the company post-war, production was difficult due to continued rationing in the United Kingdom, and limited imports of raw cocoa. In 1954, production of the chocolate apple was phased out in favour of increased production of the chocolate orange. In 1979, Terry's launched the Chocolate Lemon, but it was withdrawn three years later.

In the North American market, where it has had a variety of importers over the years, it was briefly sold as a Tobler (maker of the Toblerone) product.

Chocolate oranges appeared on the South Korean market in the GS25 chain of convenience stores in 2017.

2005 saw the closure of the Terry's factory in York, and Chocolate Orange manufacturing was moved to continental Europe by then-owner Kraft Foods. Following the 2016 sale of the brand by Mondelez to investment company Eurazeo, manufacture was consolidated in 2018 in Strasbourg, France, as a product of Carambar & Co.
 The company says that global sales of Terry's Chocolate Oranges doubled from 2019 to 2022, including a tripling of sales in the United States, for a total of 44 million Oranges annually, in countries including the UK, Ireland, the US, Canada, Australia, New Zealand and Japan.

Structure

The Terry's Chocolate Orange comprises an orange-shaped ball of chocolate mixed with orange oil, divided into 20 segments, similar to a real orange, and wrapped in orange-skin patterned foil.  When packaged, the segments are stuck together firmly in the centre; therefore, prior to unwrapping, the ball is traditionally tapped severely on a hard surface to cause the segments to separate from each other (dubbed "Tap and Unwrap" or "Whack and Unwrap").

Spin-offs
There have been a number of spin-off products, currently including:
Chocolate Orange bar: a bar of six segments, initially produced with smooth vertical segments (similar to a Toblerone bar), then, later, with textured segments that mimic those of the traditional orange shape.
Chocolate Orange minis: a bag of small segments
Chocolate Orange White Eggs: egg-shaped white chocolate versions of Chocolate Orange that were available for one Easter
Segsations: individual segments of chocolate in different flavours, including: milk chocolate, puffed rice, honeycomb, cornflake and a "double seg" of layered milk and dark chocolate, all flavoured with orange oil.
Segsations Mini Eggs: individual foil-wrapped eggs of chocolate in same flavours as Segsations, for Easter
Chocolate Orange – Egg & Spoon: a milk chocolate egg filled with an orange fondant filling (similar to Cadbury's Creme Egg)

Advertising 
The Chocolate Orange product is known for its unusual marketing, which is usually at its heaviest around Christmas. At one time it was estimated that the Chocolate Orange was found in a tenth of British Christmas stockings. Actress Dawn French has fronted numerous campaigns for the brand, often in a posed scene of defending and hiding "her" Chocolate Orange from others. Famous marketing phrases include:
Tap it and unwrap it (since replaced with "whack and unwrap")
It's not Terry's, it's mine
Don't tap it... Whack it!

More recent advertisements (after the rebranding) do not feature French and contain the new slogan "Round but not round for long" (some include the Countdown timer music). The newest advertising campaign in the United Kingdom features various situations in which people are trying to break the segments of their Terry's Chocolate Orange apart with the slogan "Smash it to pieces, love it to bits".

A new advert in 2020, featuring voiceover by Brian Blessed, explains how the Chocolate Orange is a catalyst for "British Unsquaredness", along with a new slogan, "Deliciously Unsquare".

Product range 

 Terry's Dessert Chocolate Apple (1926–1954; precursor to the Orange)
 Terry's Chocolate Lemon (short-lived 1979-1980s variant)
 Terry's Chocolate Orange Dark (formerly 'Plain')
 Terry's Chocolate Orange Milk
 Terry's Chocolate Orange Snowball (white chocolate)
 Terry's Chocolate Orange Mint (discontinued 2012)
 Terry's Chocolate Orange Toffee 
 Terry's Chocolate Orange Bars (chocolate bars, either individual or sharing bar)
 Terry's Chocolate Orange Mini segments/Segsations (individually wrapped segments)
 Terry's Chocolate Orange White Egg
 Terry's Chocolate Orange Flavour Carte D'Or ice cream (no longer in production)
 Terry's Chocolate Orange Tangy
 Terry's Chocolate Orange Cookies
 Terry's Chocolate Orange Exploding Candy
 Terry's Chocolate Orange Siesta
 Terry's Chocolate Orange Hazelnut
 Terry's Chocolate Orange Raspberry
 Terry's Chocolate Orange White Chocolate Smasher
 Terry's Chocolate Orange Toffee Crunch
 Terry's Chocolate Orange Birthday Cake
 Terry's Chocolate Orange Orange
 Terry's Chocolate Orange Ice-Creams (currently sold as limited edition)
 Terry’s Chocolate Orange Milk with Crushed Mini Eggs Easter Edition

Changes to product weight in 2016 
On 29 May 2016, the UK product size was reduced from 175g to 157g by changing the moulded shape of each segment to leave an air gap between each piece. Despite this, the price doubled in some retail outlets.

References

External links 

Brand name chocolate
British confectionery
British brands
Yorkshire cuisine
Mondelez International brands
Products introduced in 1932
Candy
Citrus dishes